Stock removal is the process of removing material (stock) from a workpiece. Stock removal processes include:

Machining
Milling
Turning
Drilling
Grinding
Filing
Broaching
Shaping
Planing
Sawing
Stock removal processes all fall under the umbrella of subtractive manufacturing, a more general term.

References

Notes

Bibliography
.

Metalworking terminology